"Top Winners" is a song by British rapper Tinie featuring vocals from British singer-songwriter and rapper Not3s. The song was released as a single on 16 March 2020. The song peaked at number sixty-four on the UK Singles Chart. The song was written by Emile Laurent, Luke Odunaike, Patrick Okogwu and Victor Samuel.

Background
The song premiered on BBC Radio 1 as Annie Mac's Hottest Record in The World. Talking about the song, Tinie Tempah said, "I made this record with Not3s because it's about a 'Winners' mindset and mentality. Having that outlook has kept us focused – it's the reason I am where I am, and the reason Not3s is where he is. It's all about striving to achieve more and continue to do better for yourself."

Music video
A music video to accompany the release of "Top Winners" was first released onto YouTube on 16 March 2020. The video show Tinie Tempah and Not3s perform playfully to the camera in a colourful rotating room.

Personnel
Credits adapted from Tidal.
 Emile Laurent – producer, programmer, writer
 Remedee – producer, programmer
 Richie Montana – producer, programmer
 Slic Vic – producer, programmer
 Chris Gehringer – mastering
 Wez Clarke – mixing
 Luke Odunaike – vocals, writer
 Patrick Okogwu – vocals, writer
 Victor Samuel – writer

Charts

Release history

References

2020 singles
2020 songs
Tinie Tempah songs
Not3s songs
Songs written by Not3s
Songs written by Tinie Tempah